The Mistik Creek is a stream in the Hudson Bay drainage basin in the Northern Region of Manitoba, Canada, approximately  northeast of Bakers Narrows.

Mistik is a Cree word for 'Tree'.

Description
The remote creek flows through Churchill River Upland portion of the Midwestern Canadian Shield forests and is surrounded by mixed forest with stands of black spruce, white spruce, jack pine, and trembling aspen. The shoreline is characterized by steeply sloping irregular rock ridges and poorly drained areas of muskeg.

Mistik Creek area is largely pristine and home to moose, black bear, lynx, wolf, and beaver. It is part of the range of the Naosap woodland caribou herd. Bird species include raven, common loon, spruce grouse, bald eagle and hawk owl. The creek is not easily accessible, but there is some trapping, hunting, and recreational fishing activity.

Lakes
Mistik Creek notably includes fourteen lakes, named in numeric order in Cree. In order from south to north, these lakes (including their English translation) are:

Payuk Lake ('One') — outflow
Neso Lake ('Two')
Nisto Lake = ('Three')
Nao Lake = ('Four')
Niyanun Lake ('Five')
Nikotwasik Lake ('Six')
Tapukok Lake ('Seven')
Uyenanao Lake ('Eight')
Kakat Lake ('Nine')
Mitatut Lake ('Ten')
Payukosap Lake ('Eleven')
Nesosap Lake ('Twelve')
Nistosap Lake ('Thirteen')
Naosap Lake =('Fourteen') — source

Course

The river begins in Naosap Lake, and the upper lakes lie in very irregular basins with low banks surrounded by muskeg and flows slowly. Downstream, the lakes become smaller and the river portions form continuous rapids. At Neso Lake, the creek passes by the Neso Lake Provincial Park and under Manitoba Highway 10, before emptying into Lake Athapapuskow via Payuk Lake's outflow Payuk Creek.

Mistik Creek Loop 

The Mistik Creek Loop is a well-known remote wilderness canoe trip,  in total length, which can be paddled in four to five days. The route is characterized by many short, unmarked portages around small sets of rapids. It begins and ends at Bakers Narrows and relies on longer portages between Lake Athapapuskow, Alberts Lake, and Naosap Lake

Tributaries
Holt Lake (right)
Vamp Creek (left)

See also

List of rivers of Manitoba

References

Rivers of Northern Manitoba
Tributaries of Hudson Bay